Hay Harvest at Éragny (French: Fenaison à Éragny) is a 1901 painting by French Impressionist painter Camille Pissarro depicting the hay harvest in the French commune of Éragny-sur-Epte.

It is currently in the collection of the National Gallery of Canada, in Ottawa.

See also
List of paintings by Camille Pissarro

External links
 https://www.gallery.ca/collection/artwork/hay-harvest-at-eragny

1901 paintings
Oise
Collections of the National Gallery of Canada
Paintings by Camille Pissarro
Farming in art